Kirchberger is a surname. Notable people with the surname include:

 Christian Kirchberger (born 1944), Austrian ice hockey player
 Günther C. Kirchberger (1928–2010), German painter and professor
 Sonja Kirchberger (born 1964), Austrian actress
 Virginia Kirchberger (born 1993), Austrian footballer